František Pithart (1915 – 20 October 2003) was a Czech chess player, European Team Chess Championship team bronze medal winner (1957).

Biography
In the 1950s František Pithart was one of the leading Czech chess players. He six times participated in the Czechoslovak Chess Championship finals and twice (1955, 1965) won the bronze medal. František Pithart was participant of many international chess tournaments. In 1956, he divided the third place in Prague, and in 1973 he took the third place in Třinec.

He represented the national team of Czechoslovakia in the largest team chess tournaments:
 in Chess Olympiad participated in 1952;
 in European Team Chess Championship participated in 1957 and won a bronze medal in the team event.

References

External links

František Pithart chess games at 365chess.com

1915 births
2003 deaths
Czechoslovak chess players
Czech chess players
Chess Olympiad competitors
20th-century chess players